Chain rule may refer to:

 Chain rule in calculus:

 Cyclic chain rule, or triple product rule:

 Chain rule (probability):

 Chain rule for Kolmogorov complexity:

 Chain rule for information entropy: